Germán Alemanno (born 27 September 1983 in Rosario) is a former Argentine footballplayer who last played for Deportivo Coopsol in the Peruvian Segunda División.

Alemanno began his career with Rosario Central, making his debut against Banfield on 13 November 2004.

During his career he was loaned to Quilmes, and Platense. In August 2009, he moved to Peruvian side Universidad San Martín where he established himself as a local legend.

External links
 
 

1983 births
Living people
Footballers from Rosario, Santa Fe
Argentine expatriate footballers
Argentine footballers
Association football forwards
Rosario Central footballers
Club Atlético Platense footballers
Quilmes Atlético Club footballers
Cerro Porteño players
Club Deportivo Universidad de San Martín de Porres players
Querétaro F.C. footballers
Club Deportivo Universidad César Vallejo footballers
Club Universitario de Deportes footballers
Argentine Primera División players
Liga MX players
Peruvian Primera División players
Expatriate footballers in Mexico
Expatriate footballers in Paraguay
Expatriate footballers in Peru
Argentine expatriate sportspeople in Mexico
Argentine expatriate sportspeople in Paraguay
Argentine expatriate sportspeople in Peru